K L Deemed to be University, formerly Koneru Lakshmaiah College of Engineering (KLCE) and Koneru Lakshmaiah University, is a higher educational institution Deemed to be University, located in Vaddeswaram, Guntur, Andhra Pradesh, India. Established in 1980 as a college of engineering, it consists of eight schools, offering academic programs at UG, PG, doctoral, and post-doctoral industry-focused courses.

History
 
KLEF was established in 1980 at Vaddeswaram as K L College of Engineering (KLCE). It became autonomous in 2006 and was recognized as deemed to be university in 2009, known as K L University. Following the University Grants Commission's request from 123 deemed institutes, not to use "university" in the name it was renamed Koneru Lakshmaiah Education Foundation. In 2019, it was renamed K L Deemed to be University.

Location 
The university is in Guntur District.

Schools
KLEF includes the following schools:
 K L College of Engineering
 K L School of Science & Humanities
 K L School of Architecture
 K L School of Management 
 K L School of Fine Arts
 K L School of Commerce
 K L School of Pharmacy
 K L School of Law
 K L School of Agriculture
 Center for Distance and Online Education
 K L Academic Staff College

Rankings

The National Institutional Ranking Framework (NIRF) ranked Koneru Lakshmaiah Education Foundation  54th overall in India in 2022, 27th among universities, 47th in the management ranking and 44th in the engineering ranking.

K L University receives One District One Green Champion Swachhata Award 2021 from GOI.

References

Universities in Andhra Pradesh
Universities and colleges in Guntur district
Educational institutions established in 1980
1980 establishments in Andhra Pradesh